The franc is the currency of French Polynesia. It is subdivided into 100 centimes. Since 1945, it has been part of the CFP franc.

History
Until 1914, the French franc circulated in French Polynesia. That year, banknotes were issued specifically for use on in the colony which circulated along with French coins. In 1945, the CFP franc was introduced, with coins issued for French Oceania (Etablisements Français de l'Océanie as the colony was then known) from 1949. From 1965, the name French Polynesia (Polynésie Française) has been used. The CFP franc is also issued in New Caledonia and was used in the New Hebrides until 1983. Since 1985, banknotes have been issued common to both French Polynesia and New Caledonia, although separate coinages continue.

Coins
In 1949, aluminium 50 centimes, 1 and 2 francs were introduced, followed by aluminium 5 francs in 1952. The 50 centimes was only issued in 1949. These coins carried the name Océanie. From 1965, the name changed to Polynesie. In 1967, nickel 10, 20 and 50 francs were introduced, followed by nickel-bronze 100 francs in 1976.

The overall design of the coins has not changed since their introduction and the obverse has always been identical to that of the coins of the New Caledonian franc. The only notable changes were the removal of the text "Union Française" and the change of name from "Établisements Français de l'Océanie" to "Polynésie Française" after 1952 and the addition of the initials "I.E.O.M" (Institut d'émission d'Outre-Mer) to the obverse in 1972.

Banknotes

In 1914, the Banque de l'Indochine in Papeete (the capital of French Polynesia on Tahiti) introduced notes for 5, 20 and 100 francs. In 1919, the Chamber of Commerce introduced notes for 25 and 50 centimes, 1 and 2 francs. The Banque André Krajewski also issued notes for these denominations in 1920. The Banque de l'Indochine introduced 500 franc notes in 1923, followed by 1000 francs in 1940.

Wartime emergency currency was issued during both World War I and World War II in denominations ranging from 25 centimes to 2½ francs. The illustrated notes (right) are from the 1943 issue of Bons de Caisse des Etablissements Français de l'Océanie. 

In 1969, the Institut d'Emission d'Outre-Mer, Papeete took over the issuance of paper money, introducing notes for 100, 500, 1000 and 5000 francs. The 100 and 1000 franc notes have two variants. The earlier issue lacked the state title "République française". The 500 and 5000 franc notes have had the state title since their introductions. The 100 franc notes were replaced by coins in 1976.

In 1985, 10,000 franc notes common to all the French Pacific Territories were introduced. These were followed, between 1992 and 1996, by 500, 1000 and 5000 franc notes for all of the French Pacific Territories. The overall design has not changed since 1969.

See also

CFP franc
New Caledonian franc
New Hebrides franc

References

Notes

Sources

External links
 

Currencies of Oceania
Fixed exchange rate